Harold "Hal" Cole (November 20, 1912 in Tacoma, Washington – November 12, 1970 in
Los Angeles, California) was an American racecar driver.

Indy 500 results

Source

Complete Formula One Championship results
(key)

References

1912 births
1970 deaths
Indianapolis 500 drivers
Sportspeople from Tacoma, Washington
Racing drivers from Washington (state)